Abanotubani (literally "bath district") is the ancient district of Tbilisi, Georgia, known for its sulphuric baths. 

Located at the eastern bank of the Mtkvari River at the foot of Narikala fort across Metekhisubani, Abanotubani is an important historic part of the city: it is where according to a legend the King of Iberia, Vakhtang Gorgasali’s falcon fell, leading to a discovery of the hot springs and, subsequently, to founding of a new capital.

References 

Neighborhoods of Tbilisi